Michael Gordon Weist III is an American producer and actor. He is known for his appearance in the Hulu movie Jawline, which won the 2019 Sundance Film Festival.

Weist is a member of The Recording Academy. Weist's television and movie work includes guest appearances on Dr. Phil, The Kids Choice Awards, The Grammy Awards, and appearances in movies, such as Hulu's Jawline, the Amazon Prime Original, TanaCon: What Really Happened, Shane Dawson's The Truth About TanaCon, and more.

TanaCon 

In June 2018, Weist held an event in collaboration with YouTuber Tana Mongeau, called "TanaCon." The event was cancelled just hours after it began as the event oversold tickets to the venue's capacity. Weist filed for bankruptcy and dissolved his company, Good Times Entertainment. Weist claimed his company lost $700,000 over the event.

Companies 
In 2014, Weist announced his record label, SwerV Records. 

Founded in 2019, Weist is the President and CEO of Juice Krate Media Group, a company that works with content creators and influencers. 

Weist also founded The Blushing Group.

Personal life 
Michael is openly gay.

Controversies & legal issues 
In 2017 Weist filed a defamation lawsuit against former clients, Bryce Hall and Mikey Barone, which was briefly depicted in the Hulu documentary Jawline. The case settled in 2018; Hall posted a statement via Twitter: "I made some harsh statements about Michael and regret making those statements, including any suggestion of sexual assault. I am sorry for what happened and I am glad it's over."

After an interview with To Catch a Predator host Chris Hansen, Weist filed a lawsuit against TikToker and former client Danielle Cohn and her boyfriend Mason in June 2022.

On June 1st, 2022, Michael posted a statement via Twitter in which he stated he filed a lawsuit against the social media platform TikTok; stating: "[TikTok] has a responsibility to its users and creators; the banning and suspension of creator accounts without cause must stop. This pattern of behavior & treatment of creators across TikTok has got to be stopped. Imagine if TikTok is a creator’s primary income… It’s time creators stand up and assert their rights; this is not ok."

References

External links 

 
 
 
 Michael Weist at Twitter
 Michael Weist at Instagram

Living people
1996 births